Federal Highway 121 (Carretera Federal 121) is a Federal Highway of Mexico. The highway travels from Apizaco, Tlaxcala in the north to Puebla City, Puebla in the south.

References

121